Herz aus Glas (subtitled "Singet, denn der Gesang vertreibt die Wölfe" [German for "Sing, for singing drives away the wolves"], French "Cœur de verre") is the ninth album by Popol Vuh. It was originally released in 1977 on Brain Records. In 2005 SPV re-released the album with two bonus tracks. This album was released as the original motion picture soundtrack of Heart of Glass (Original German title: "Herz aus Glas", French title "Coeur de verre") by German director Werner Herzog, but in fact only two tracks ("Engel der Gegenwart" and "Hüter der Schwelle") were actually featured in the film.

Track listing 
All tracks composed by Florian Fricke except tracks 5 and 8 composed by Daniel Fichelscher. 
 "Engel der Gegenwart" – 8:18
 "Blätter aus dem Buch der Kühnheit" – 4:19
 "Das Lied von den hohen Bergen" – 4:12
 "Hüter der Schwelle" – 3:47
 "Der Ruf" – 4:42
 "Singet, denn der Gesang vertreibt die Wölfe" – 4:15
 "Gemeinschaft" – 3:50

2005 bonus tracks
"Auf dem Weg - On The Way" (Alternative Guitar Version) – 4:42 
"Hand in Hand in Hand" (Agape Guitar Version) – 5:44

Personnel 
Florian Fricke – piano
Daniel Fichelscher – guitar, percussion

Guest musicians
Alois Gromer – sitar
Mathias von Tippelskirch – flute

Credits 
Recorded at Bavaria Studios, Munich 
Engineered by Hardy Bank, Frank Fiedler and Robert Wedel 
Produced by Florian Fricke and Renate Knaup

References

External links 
 http://www.venco.com.pl/~acrux/herz.htm

Popol Vuh (band) soundtracks
1977 soundtrack albums
Film soundtracks